Lycée Lakanal is a public secondary school in Sceaux, Hauts-de-Seine, France, in the Paris metropolitan area. It was named after Joseph Lakanal, a French politician, and an original member of the Institut de France. The school also offers a middle school and highly ranked "classes préparatoires" undergraduate training. Famous French scientists and writers have graduated from lycée Lakanal, such as Jean Giraudoux, Alain-Fournier and Frédéric Joliot-Curie. The school includes a science building, a large park, a track, and dormitories for the Pôle Espoir Rugby and the boarding students. Several teachers also live at the school along with boarding students. The main classrooms and the dormitories are in one building, and the school uses space heaters in every classroom except the science building's classrooms and the gymnasium.

 the school has about 2,550 students in all levels, from junior high school to preparatory classes.

History
Jules Ferry, the Minister of Public Instruction in the 1880s, ordered the school built. Construction took place between 1882 and 1885.

Famous former pupils and students
 
 Charles Péguy (1873–1914), writer
 Paul Hazard (1878–1944), historian
 Jules Isaac (1877–1963), historian
 Marc Boegner (1881–1970), pastor and writer
 Jean Giraudoux (1882–1944), writer
 Alain-Fournier (1886–1914), writer
 Jacques Rivière (1886–1925), writer
 Maurice Genevoix (1890–1980), writer
 Frédéric Joliot-Curie (1900–1958), Nobel laureate in chemistry, physicist
 Robert Bresson (1901–1999), filmmaker
 Karl-Jean Longuet (1904–1981), sculptor
 Arthur Adamov (1908–1970), writer and playwright
 Carlos Delgado Chalbaud (1909-1950), politician, engineer, military officer from Venezuela
 Maurice Allais (1911–2010), economist, Nobel laureate in economics
 Pierre Hervé (1913–1993), deputy
 Jean-Toussaint Desanti (1914–2002), philosopher, professor at the École normale supérieure and the Sorbonne
 Jacques Chaban-Delmas (1915–2000), politician
 Jacques Durand (1920-2009), engineer and automobile designer
 Georges Condominas (1921–), ethnologist
 Jean-Jacques Pauvert (1926–), editor
 Emmanuel Le Roy Ladurie (1929–), historian, honorary professor at the Collège de France
 Gérard Genette (1930–), literary theorist
 Joël Schmidt, writer
 Dimitri Kitsikis (1935-), Geopolitician, Fellow, Royal Society of Canada, Honorary President, The Dimitri Kitsikis Public Foundation.
 James Austin (1940–), fine-art and architectural photographer
 Jacques Bouveresse (1940–), philosopher, professor at the Collège de France
 Colin François Lloyd Austin (1941–2010), scholar of ancient Greek
 Guy Hocquenghem (1946–1988), writer
 Julien Clerc (1947–), singer
 Rony Brauman (1950–), doctor
 Laurent Collet-Billon (1950–), general delegate for armament
 Gérard Leclerc (1951–), journalist
 Philippe Laguérie (1952–), priest
 Renaud Van Ruymbeke (1952–), magistrate
 Denis Lensel (1954–), journalist and writer
 Sauveur Chemouni (1954–) founder of Invision Technologies, California
 Gilles Leroy (1958–), writer (Prix Goncourt 2007)
 Cédric Klapisch (1961–), director
 Christophe Claro (1962–), writer
 Laurent Vachaud (1964–), scriptwriter
 Emmanuel Bourdieu (1965–), writer, philosopher and director, son of sociologist and Collège de France professor Pierre Bourdieu
 Marie NDiaye (1967–), writer (Prix Goncourt 2009)
 Christophe Ferré, writer
 Pierre Courtade (1915–1963), journalist and writer
 Muriel Barbery (1969 –), writer
 Yann Golanski (1971–), theoretical astrophysicist, mathematician and software pioneer
 Laurent Chambon (1972-), sociologist
 Guillaume Peltier (1976–), politician
 Grégory Lamboley (1982–), international French rugby player

Lycée Lakanal in popular culture

Lycée Lakanal is the visual basis for the fictional Kadic Junior High School/Kadic Academy from Code Lyoko. However, it is not in the same location as Lakanal, being in Boulogne-Billancourt just north of there.

External links
 Lycée Lakanal
 
 Lycee Lakanal on Facebook

References

 
nl:Lycée Lakanal